A Very Special Season is the twentieth studio album and first holiday album by American singer Diana Ross, released on November 14, 1994 by EMI Records. Produced by Nick Martinelli, whom Ross worked with several times around the early nineties, it is a lush, soulful pop album, consisting mostly of traditional Christmas standards as well as takes on more contemporary songs by Burt Bacharach, John Lennon, and Stevie Wonder. The set was only released for the international market where it peaked at number 37 on the UK Albums Chart and was certified Gold by the British Phonographic Industry (BPI).

The album was remastered and repackaged as Wonderful Christmas Time in 2018.  The re-titled re-issue of the album, issued by Ross' own label Ross Records, featured new cover art and the six-tracks that Ross had originally recorded for the 1994 Hallmark album, Making Spirits Bright, featuring the London Symphony Orchestra. Ross promoted the release with performances in the Macy's Thanksgiving Day Parade, and at the Rockefeller Center Tree-lighting concert special in November 2018.

Critical reception

Allmusic editor Jose F. Promis found that A Very Special Season "easily ranks among the diva's best of the '90s. Instead of opting for hip arrangements aimed at pleasing a younger, jaded audience, all the songs on this set are classically arranged with lush orchestrations, resulting in a truly timeless holiday album, not unlike what one would have expected from the crooners and sirens of yesteryear. The songs are all lovingly produced, and Ross effectively wraps her silken pipes around each tune with utmost sincerity."

Track listing
All songs produced by Nick Martinelli.

Charts

Certifications

References

EMI Records albums
Diana Ross albums
1994 Christmas albums
Christmas albums by American artists